A laptop battle is a competitive event for an electronic musician to match their skills against others. Competition rules limit equipment to a laptop computer and an external pointing device (mouse). Some competitions allow external hardware, usually a single MIDI controller (this set-up is very similar to those used for live PA). There are typically three or four rounds, following a single elimination bracket or similar structure. Each round consists of a number of head-to-head matches between two randomly selected participants. Rules vary, but typically the competitors are allowed two to three minutes on stage to play their individual compositions. Stage presence is often a key element for judging, in addition to technical finesse and an ability to engage the audience.

A panel of judges decide which contestant advances to the next round, single elimination style. Usually, there are no restrictions on the type of material performed other than it must be the competitor's original creation. This aids in providing a distinction from DJ battles, wherein competitors play music created by others. Musical genres vary widely, with tendencies towards intelligent dance music, glitch, experimental electronica, mashups, house and technoid.

Various local and national laptop battles have garnered the attention of electronic music and sound design production sponsors, such as Ableton, Mackie, and Native Instruments. Sponsor products are often included in competition prizes. Laptop battles are becoming a worldwide phenomenon with battles organized in Germany, the United Kingdom, Japan, New Zealand, and Italy.

Formats 

All formats vary in length of rounds (usually 2–3 minutes) and competition bracket style (single or double elimination). Some battles also include alternating sets by each performer, such as two 2-minute sets each. Mouse and keyboard rules may vary as well, and sometimes will allow for a USB version of the peripheral if the on-board peripheral is disabled or unused on the laptop.

Laptop only

This format was used in the 2006 Atlanta Laptop Battle I, II, and III.

This format only allows the following equipment:
One laptop
One external sound card

Single MIDI controller

This format was used for the 2006 US National Finals, the 2006 Atlanta Laptop Battle Finals, and the Laptop Battle UK competitions.

This format has the following restrictions:
One laptop computer
One external sound card
One MIDI controller
All equipment must fit in a 2' x 2' square

Exhibition matches

This format was featured in the 2007 Atlanta Preliminaries I Laptop Battle. It involves two competitors not included in the single- or double-elimination tournament structure, and may include more experienced performers or the judges from the ongoing laptop battle. This format is unique in that the actual sonic material utilized in the battle is limited, and performers have a limited amount of time to create their pieces.

This format has the following restrictions:
One laptop computer
One external sound card
One MIDI controller
All equipment must fit in a 2' x 2' square
Preparation is limited to a specific window of time before the match
Source material is limited to supplied samples, which are not available to the performers until the preparation window

See also

Laptronica
Computer music
Battle of the Bands

References

External links
 WORLD-FAMOUS LAPTOP BATTLE™  LAPTOPBATTLE.ORG - #1 (since 2003)
 http://www.laptopbattle.com/ - #2 (since 2007)
 http://www.fourthcity.net/ - Seattle-based artist collective that created the Laptop Battle
 https://web.archive.org/web/20080519111616/http://www.nophi.net/laptopbattle/ - Atlanta Laptop Battle Series (2006-2007)
 http://atlanta.creativeloafing.com/gyrobase/Content?oid=oid%3A142317 - Write-up of the Atlanta Laptop Battle Finals
 https://web.archive.org/web/20090803194232/http://laptopbattlenyc.com/ - NYC Laptop Battle
 Rollingstone - Rolling Stone Rock and Roll Daily article about the first-ever NYC laptop battle
 http://www.laptopbattle.org/videos.php - Laptop Battle Video Archive
 http://www.laptopbattle.de/ - Munich/Germany (since 2005)
 http://www.laptopbattle-mannheim.de/ - Mannheim/Germany (since 2006)
 https://web.archive.org/web/20070821145214/http://www.laptopbattle-stuttgart.de/ - Stuttgart/Germany (since 2007)
 http://www.laptopbattle-dresden.de/ - Dresden/Germany (since 2009)
 https://web.archive.org/web/20070613182738/http://www.laptopbattle.jp/ - Tokyo (since 2007)
 https://web.archive.org/web/20071215214238/http://www.laptopbattleuk.com/ - Bristol/UK (since 2006)
 http://www.myspace.com/laptopbattleuk/ - UK (since 2006)

Music competitions
Battle